The Chalchalero viscacha rat or Chalchalero vizcacha rat (Tympanoctomys loschalchalerosorum) is a species of caviomorph rodent in the family Octodontidae. It was formerly considered to be monotypic within the genus Salinoctomys, but has been shown by genetic analysis to nest within Tympanoctomys, and in particular, within the variation of T. barrerae. The species is endemic to a small area of northwestern Argentina, where it lives in shrublands bordering the salt flats of the Salinas Grandes. Its diet consists of halophyte plants.  It is named after an Argentine musical group, Los Chalchaleros, whose songs were popular with its discoverers.

Description
The Chalchalero viscacha rat is a medium-sized species of rat. Its dorsal fur is dark brownish black while its underparts are white. The tail is relatively long, clad with hair along its entire length and ends with a black tassel. The soles of the feet have six pads, and there is a fringe of hairs around the feet.

Status
It lives among the salt-loving plants that grow between the salt pans and the dense thorn scrub typical of the surrounding area. Its population is decreasing and the International Union for Conservation of Nature has rated its conservation status as "critically endangered".

References

Mammals described in 2000
Mammals of Argentina
Tympanoctomys